The 2024 elections for the Pennsylvania House of Representatives will be held on , with all districts up for election. The term of office for those elected in 2024 will begin when the House of Representatives convenes in January 2025. Pennsylvania State Representatives are elected for two-year terms, with all 203 seats up for election every two years.

On , Democrats affirmed their first majority in the chamber since 2010 after winning 3 special elections.

Primary elections

Democratic primary

Republican primary

General election

Overview

District breakdown 

Source: Pennsylvania Department of State

See also 

 2024 Pennsylvania elections
 Elections in Pennsylvania

References

External links 

 
 
 
  (State affiliate of the U.S. League of Women Voters)
 

Pennsylvania
Pennsylvania House of Representatives elections
House of Representatives